The following is a complete list of Michelin starred restaurants in Thailand. The 2018 edition was the inaugural edition of the Michelin Guide in Thailand and it will cover Bangkok. Bangkok was the seventh Asian city/region to have a dedicated Red Guide, after Tokyo, Hong Kong & Macau, Osaka & Kyoto, Singapore, Shanghai and Seoul. Since then Michelin Guide Thailand continues to expand its coverage to Phuket, Phang-Nga, Chiang Mai, and Ayutthaya. This year 4 more provinces in Isan region; Nakorn Ratchasima, Ubon Ratchathani, Udon Thani, and Khon Kaen were added in the latest 2023 edition. For more information, please visit http://guide.michelin.com.

List

References

Food and drink in Thailand
Lists of restaurants
Restaurants in Thailand
Restaurants
Restaurants